Chuth Khay / ខ្ជិត ខ្យៃ (ហៅ ជុតខៃ) is a Cambodian writer and translator. He was born in 1940 in Koh Somrong, Cambodia, an island on the Mekong about one hundred kilometers north of the capital. The youngest son, he was the only one in a family of ten children to attend a Western school. He pursued primary and secondary studies in Kampong Cham. While working as a teacher of French, he attended classes at the Royal University of Phnom Penh and, in 1968, received his law degree. Opposed to the monarchy, he became a legal advisor to the Ministry of Defense after Sihanouk's removal from power in 1970. From 1973 to 1974, he served as interim dean of the law school. In 1973, he published two successful collections of short stories: Ghouls, Ghosts, and Other Infernal Creatures and Widow of Five Husbands. He also wrote for Soth Polin's newspaper, Nokor Thom (នគរធំ), and published his books and translations with its publishing house. Forced into the countryside by the Khmer Rouge, he miraculously escaped death by pretending to be mute. Granted refuge in France in 1980 and French citizenship, he took the name Chuth Chance, for receiving a second chance in life. He worked for several years as a taxi driver, and is now retired and lives near Paris.

Publications

Books (in Khmer)

 ខ្មោចព្រាយអសុរកាយ (Ghouls, Ghosts, and Other Infernal Creatures, Phnom Penh, 1973; republished by SIPAR in 2018)
 មេម៉ាយប្ដី ៥ (Widow of Five Husbands, Phnom Penh, 1973)
 កូនក្របីមានមនោញ្ចេតនា (A Sentimental Baby Buffalo), SIPAR, Phnom Penh, 2010.
 វិប្បដិសារី (Remorse), Angkor Publishing, 2008.
 មេម៉ាយពីរបែប
 ក្មេងសាលាបារាំង (A Young Boy in the French School), SIPAR, Phnom Penh, 2010.
 ក្មេងវត្ត (A Pagoda Kid During the French Time), illustrated by Chan Vitharin, SIPAR, Phnom Penh, 2010.
 ៣២ឆ្នាំក្រោយមក (32 years later), Editions Angkor, Phnom Penh, 2018.

Translations (to Khmer)

  ក្រុមបេរេបៃតង (The Green Berets by Robin Moore, Phnom Penh, Nokor Thom, ?)
  បុត្រឆ្នើមនៃសង្គ្រាម (The Centurions by Jean Lartéguy, Phnom Penh, Nokor Thom, 1971)
  ជញ្ជាំង (The Wall by Jean-Paul Sartre, Phnom Penh, Nokor Thom, 1971)
  លោកឯកអគ្គរដ្ឋទូត (The Ambassador by Morris West, Phnom Penh, Nokor Thom, 1971)

Books (in French)

 Comment j'ai menti aux Khmers Rouges, L'Harmattan, 2004, 309p.
 L'Indochine vietnamienne, Le Lys Bleu Éditions, 2022, 536p.

Translations of his works

 Un fantôme au coeur de Phnom-Penh, short story translated to French by Chuth Khay and Alain Daniel, Éditions du Serpent à Plumes, 27, Spring 1995, p. 11-14.
 Goules, démons, et autres créatures infernales... translated from Khmer to French by Christophe Macquet, in Revue Europe, "Écrivains du Cambodge", 81e année, N° 889 / Mai 2003. See also Revue bilingue MEET, n°15, Porto Rico / Phnom Penh, 2011.
 Ghouls, Ghosts, and Other Infernal Creatures, translated from Khmer to French by Christophe Macquet and from French to English by Daniela Hurezanu, In the Shadow of Angkor: Contemporary Writing From Cambodia, Manoa, University of Hawaii Press (2004).
 かわいい水牛の子, A Sentimental Baby Buffalo; 寺の子ども, A Pagoda Kid During the French Time; フランス学校の子ども, A Young Boy in the French School. Translated into Japanese by Tomoko Okada, in Tsuioku no kanbojia (追憶のカンボジア), Tokyo University of Foreign Studies Press, (東京外国語大学出版会), 2014.

See also

 Hak Chhay Hok
 Kong Bunchhoeun
 Keng Vannsak
 Khun Srun
 Soth Polin
 SIPAR

References

 Écrivains et expressions littéraires du Cambodge au XXe s. Contribution à l'histoire de la littérature khmère, by Khing Hoc Dy, vol. 2, L'Harmattan, 1993.
 អក្សរសិល្ប៍ខ្មែរសតវត្សទី២០, (Anthology of Khmer Literature: 20th Century), by Khing Hoc Dy, Phnom Penh, Ed. de La Plus Haute Tour, 2002, 665 p.
 Five Cambodian Writers by Christophe Macquet, in Europe, French magazine, 81e année, N° 889 / Mai 2003. Republished in Revue bilingue MEET, n°15, Bilingual Khmer/French edition, Porto Rico / Phnom Penh, 2011. 
 In the Shadow of Angkor: Contemporary Writing From Cambodia, Manoa, University of Hawaii Press (2004)

External links
 Les pensionnaires de la pagode, un bijou de la littérature khmère, by Anne-Laure Porée, in Cambodge Soir, December 27, 2005, p16.
 Chuth Khay l'insoumis a choisi l'écriture comme exutoire, by Anne-Laure Porée, in Cambodge Soir, January 2, 2007, p12.
 L’éducation monastique et scolaire dans le Cambodge rural à la fin de l’époque coloniale, selon l’écrivain Chuth Khay, by Steven Prigent, March 2016.
 Chuth Khay – Cambodia’s Charles Dickens, by Taing Rinith, Khmer Times, October 25, 2019.

Cambodian male writers
Translators to Khmer
People from Kampong Cham province
Cambodian emigrants to France
1940 births
Living people
Cambodian short story writers
Male short story writers
20th-century short story writers
20th-century male writers
20th-century translators
21st-century short story writers
21st-century male writers
21st-century translators
Cambodian translators
Cambodian taxi drivers